Columbia TriStar or Columbia Tristar may refer to:

Columbia TriStar Motion Picture Group, now Sony Pictures Motion Picture Group
Columbia TriStar Home Video, later called Columbia TriStar Home Entertainment and now Sony Pictures Home Entertainment
Columbia TriStar Television, active from 1994 to 2002
Columbia TriStar Film Distributors, now Sony Pictures Releasing
Columbia TriStar Film Distributors International, now Sony Pictures Releasing International
Columbia TriStar Marketing Group, the only company continuously carrying the said name; not much is known about CTMG.

See also
SPE (disambiguation)
Columbia (disambiguation)
Tristar (disambiguation)